The CONCACAF Final Round of the CONCACAF zone of the 2002 FIFA World Cup qualification, was contested between the 6 remaining teams of the qualification process. The teams were placed into a single group, with matches played against each other on a home-and-away basis. The top three teams would qualify for the 2002 FIFA World Cup.

Standings

Matches

Matchday 1

Matchday 2

Matchday 3

Matchday 4

Matchday 5

Matchday 6

Matchday 7

Matchday 8

Matchday 9

Matchday 10

External links
FIFA official page
RSSSF - 2002 World Cup Qualification

4
Q2
Q2
Q2
Qual
2000 in CONCACAF football
2000–01 in Costa Rican football
2001–02 in Costa Rican football
2000–01 in Mexican football
2001–02 in Mexican football
2000–01 in Honduran football
2001–02 in Honduran football
2000–01 in Jamaican football
2001–02 in Jamaican football
2001 in Trinidad and Tobago football
2001 in American soccer

de:Fußball-Weltmeisterschaft 2002/Qualifikation#CONCACAF Finalrunde
es:Clasificación de Concacaf para la Copa Mundial de Fútbol de 2002#Fase final
ko:2002년 FIFA 월드컵 북아메리카 지역 예선#결승라운드
nl:Wereldkampioenschap voetbal 2002 (kwalificatie CONCACAF)#Finaleronde
pt:Eliminatórias da Copa do Mundo FIFA de 2002 - América do Norte, Central e Caribe#Fase Final
ru:Чемпионат мира по футболу 2002 (отборочный турнир, КОНКАКАФ)#Финальный этап